Black Jungle is an outer rural location in Darwin. The name of the locality derived from "Black Jungle" which first appeared on a plan of the "Umpity Doo Homestead" block, Agricultural Lease No 28 in 1910.

References

External links

Suburbs of Darwin, Northern Territory